Ciudad Antigua is a municipality in the Nueva Segovia department of Nicaragua.

Municipalities of the Nueva Segovia Department